John Shaw (1743-1807) was a slave trader and the former Mayor of Liverpool. Shaw was responsible for at least 33 slave voyages. Over half of his slaves were taken from the Bight of Biafra.

Shaw was the Mayor of Liverpool twice; firstly in 1794-95 and again in 1800–1801.

Shaw used his wealth to create the Arrowe Park Estate, which subsequently became a country park.

References

Sources
 

English slave traders
People from Liverpool
1743 births
1807 deaths